Gëzim Hajdinaga is a Montenegrin-Albanian politician, former member of Democratic Union of Albanians.

Biography
Hajdinaga was born in Ulcinj, Montenegro to an Albanian family on 2 January 1964. He is an electrical engineer, but most of his professional career he spent in politics. He is member of Democratic Union of Albanians  since the formation of the party.  For two terms he served as Minister for the protection of rights of national and ethnic groups in the Government of Montenegro. In 2006, he was elected as Mayor of Ulcin. He owns property in Shkodra, Albania. His father purchased the property in Shkodra in 1990 and turned it out to be a good investment. As a mayor he contributed a lot in protecting the Ottoman architecture in Ulcinj, rebuilding the Sailor's Mosque and the restoration of Çarshia.

See also
Mayor of Ulcinj
Ulcinj
Democratic Union of Albanians

Notes

1964 births
People from Ulcinj
Living people
Albanians in Montenegro